On 30 April 2018, two suicide bombers detonated near government buildings in central Kabul, Afghanistan, killing at least 29 people and injuring 50.

Victims 
Among the fatalities were 9 journalists, Agence France Presse photographer Shah Marai, TOLO News Cameraman Yar Mohammad Tokhi, Ebadollah Hananzi and Sabvon Kakeker of Radio Free Europe; Maharam Darani of Radio Azadai; TV1 cameramen's Ghazi Rasoli and Norozali Rajabi, the reporter Salim Talash and cameraman Ali Salimi both of Mashal TV. Additionally, an Al Jazeera cameraman Naser Hashemi, Omar Soltani of Reuters, Ahmadshah Azimi of Nedai Aghah, Ayar Amar of newspaper Vahdat Mili and Davod Ghisanai of the TV channel Mivand were injured.

Perpetrator 
Islamic State has claimed responsibility for the attack though the Taliban is also suspected.

See also 
List of terrorist attacks in Kabul

References 

2018 murders in Afghanistan
2018 in Afghanistan
Suicide bombings in 2018
April 2018 crimes in Asia
ISIL terrorist incidents in Afghanistan
Islamic terrorist incidents in 2018
Mass murder in 2018
Mass murder in Kabul
Murder–suicides in Asia
Terrorist incidents in Afghanistan in 2018
Terrorist incidents in Kabul